Helen Margaret Blau is an American biologist and the Donald E. and Delia B. Baxter Foundation Professor and Director of the Baxter Laboratory for Stem Cell Biology at Stanford University School of Medicine. She is known for establishing the reversibility of the mammalian differentiated state.  Her landmark papers showed that nuclear reprogramming and the activation of novel programs of gene expression were possible, overturning the prevailing view that the differentiated state was fixed and irreversible.  Her discoveries opened the door for cellular reprogramming and its application to stem cell biology.

Biography 

Helen Blau was born in London and is a dual citizen of the United States and Great Britain. She earned a B.A. from the University of York in England and an M.A. and Ph.D. in biology from Harvard University with Fotis C. Kafatos.  After a postdoctoral fellowship with Charles J. Epstein in the Departments of Biochemistry and Biophysics and the Division of Medical Genetics at UCSF, she joined the faculty at Stanford University in 1978.  She was awarded an endowed chair in 1999 and named Director of the Baxter Laboratory for Stem Cell Biology in 2002.

Blau is known for her support of women in science and success in mentoring numerous young scientists who comprise the next generation of academic leaders in muscle biology and regenerative medicine.

Research 

In the 1980s Dr. Blau's findings challenged the prevalent view that the mammalian differentiated state is fixed and irreversible.  In her famous heterokaryon experiments she fused differentiated cells of two different species to form stable non-dividing heterokaryons, and found that previously silent genes could be activated. As a result, human keratinocytes, hepatocytes and fibroblasts expressed muscle genes that they normally never would. This body of work showed that the differentiated state requires continuous regulation and that a shift in the stoichiometry of trans-acting regulators induces nuclear reprogramming to another differentiated state. Her discoveries fostered the development of the field of stem cell biology and regenerative medicine.

Blau characterized muscle stem cells and showed they are dysfunctional in aging and in muscular dystrophy. She showed that stem cells lose their regenerative potential when grown in traditional plastic dishes and overcame this limitation by fabricating bioengineered microenvironments that mimic crucial stem cell niche and tissue properties. She
has applied this approach to identify molecules that rejuvenate the function of
the aged stem cell population and enhance muscle regeneration.

Blau showed that telomere dysfunction in conjunction with dystrophin deficiency plays a central role in the skeletal muscle wasting and fatal cardiomyopathy characteristic of Duchenne muscular dystrophy.  Her lab's novel technologies enable rapid, transient and robust elongation of telomeres to overcome cellular dysfunction due to short telomeres, which have translational applications.

Dr. Blau's lab applied evolutionary lessons from newts and salamanders that regenerate limbs to identify genes that constitute barriers to regeneration.  By transiently alleviating these brakes on the cell cycle, post-mitotic cells are induced to divide, reconstituting a regenerative cell source.

A hallmark of Blau's research is the development and application of novel technologies. Her discovery of β-galactosidase complementation is widely used in drug discovery. Non-invasive bioluminescence imaging enables highly sensitive temporal and spatial resolution of muscle stem cell regenerative function in vivo. Using single cell lineage tracking and the Baxter algorithms her lab developed, cell morphology, movement, cell-cell interactions, division behavior and gene expression can be dynamically monitored, resolving the cellular basis for population changes, in response to pharmacologic interventions.  She has eight issued US patents.

Current research 

Blau's ongoing research focuses on cellular reprogramming, therapeutic interventions to enhance stem cell function in muscle regeneration, and cell rejuvenation strategies.

Honors 
Along her professional career, among other honors, Professor Blau has won the following distinctions:
 Elected Fellow, American Association for the Advancement of Science (1991)
 Senior Career Recognition Award, Women in Cell Biology, ASCB (1992)
 President, American Society for Developmental Biology (1994–1995)
 Elected Member of the National Academy of Medicine (1995)
 Yvette Mayent-Rothschild Professor, Institut Curie (1995; 2014)
 Nobel Forum Lecture, Karolinska Institute, Stockholm, Sweden (1995) 
 MERIT Award, National Institutes of Health (1995) 
 Elected Member of the American Academy of Arts and Sciences (1996)
 FASEB Excellence in Science Award, FASEB (1999)
 McKnight Technological Innovations in Neuroscience Award (2001)
 President, International Society of Differentiation (2002–2004)
 Honorary Doctorate, University of Nijmegen, the Netherlands (2003)
 Rolf-Sammet Professorship (2003), Frankfurt, Germany
 American Association for Cancer Research - Irving Weinstein Foundation Outstanding Innovations Award (2011)
 NIH Director's Transformative Research Award (2012-2017)
 Stanford Office of Technology Licensing Outstanding Inventor Award (2015)
 The Glenn Award for Research in Biological Mechanisms of Aging  (2015)
 Elected Member of the National Academy of Sciences (2016)
 Ordinary Member of the Pontifical Academy of Sciences (named by Pope Francis, Saturday, November 4, 2017)
 Elected Member of the National Academy of Inventors (2017)
 Elected Member of the American Philosophical Society (2018)

Public service and advisory committees 

Helen Blau has contributed to multiple national and international committees and boards. She served on the Congressional Liaison Committee for Public Policy for the American Society for Cell Biology.  At NIH she served on the (RAC) Oversight Committee of Gene Therapy (created by Harold Varmus) and as a member of the Council of the National Institute on Aging. She has been a member of the Harvard Board of Overseers and the Board of Directors of the American Society of Gene Therapy and the Council of the National Academy of Medicine of the National Academy of Sciences.  She has advised the Conseil Stratégique de l’Association Française contre les Myopathies (AFM) and served on the Scientific Advisory Boards of the Helmsley Trust and the Ellison Medical Foundation.  She currently serves on the Pew Charitable Trust Scholars Advisory Committee and the Council of the American Academy of Arts and Sciences.

Personal life 

Blau was born in England, spent her early childhood in the U.S. and then lived in Europe until she moved to the United States for graduate school. She speaks French and German. Her father, George E. Blau, was Chief historian for the U.S. Government in Europe and her mother Gertrud M. Blau was an instructor of comparative literature at Heidelberg University and they strongly encouraged Helen and her sister Professor Eve Blau, now on the faculty at Harvard University, to pursue higher education. She is married to Professor David Spiegel, a research psychiatrist at Stanford University, and they have two children, Daniel Blau Spiegel, an architect, and Julia Blau Spiegel, a lawyer. Professor Blau and her husband are avid scuba divers and skiers.

References

External links
 Blau Lab website at Stanford University
 Brian K. Kennedy in conversation with Helen M. Blau - video
 "Helen Blau: An Oral History," Stanford Historical Society Oral History Program, 2015.

Living people
1948 births
American women biochemists
Harvard Graduate School of Arts and Sciences alumni
Members of the United States National Academy of Sciences
Alumni of the University of York
Members of the American Philosophical Society
Members of the National Academy of Medicine
Fellows of the American Academy of Arts and Sciences
Fellows of the American Association for the Advancement of Science
21st-century American women